Robert Lattermann (25 November 1930 – 13 May 1995) was an Austrian equestrian. He competed in the individual dressage event at the 1956 Summer Olympics.

References

1930 births
1995 deaths
Austrian male equestrians
Austrian dressage riders
Olympic equestrians of Austria
Equestrians at the 1956 Summer Olympics
Place of birth missing